The 1952 College Football All-America team is composed of college football players who were selected as All-Americans by various organizations and writers that chose College Football All-America Teams in 1952. The eight selectors recognized by the NCAA as "official" for the 1952 season are (1) the Associated Press, (2) the United Press, (3) the All-America Board, (4) the American Football Coaches Association (AFCA), (5) the Football Writers Association of America (FWAA), (6) the International News Service (INS), (7) the Newspaper Enterprise Association (NEA), and (8) the Sporting News.

Maryland quarterback Jack Scarbath and Notre Dame halfback Johnny Lattner were the only two players to be unanimously named first-team All-Americans by all eight official selectors. Lattner was awarded the 1953 Heisman Trophy.

Consensus All-Americans
For the year 1952, the NCAA recognizes eight published All-American teams as "official" designations for purposes of its consensus determinations. The following chart identifies the NCAA-recognized consensus All-Americans and displays which first-team designations they received.

All-American selections for 1952

Ends 
Frank McPhee, Princeton (AAB, INS, NEA, SN, UP, WC)
Bernie Flowers, Purdue (AAB, FWAA, NEA, SN, UP, WC)
Eddie Bell, Pennsylvania (AFCA, INS, AP-2)
Tom Stolhandske, Texas (AP-1, FWAA, INS)
Tom Scott, Virginia (AP-1; NEA)
Joe Collier, Northwestern (INS)
Don Branby, Colorado (AP-1)
Buck Martin, Georgia Tech (AFCA)
Steve Mellinger, Kentucky (NEA)
Ed Luke, Michigan State (AP-2)
Harry Babcock, Georgia (AP-2)

Tackles 
Dick Modzelewski, Maryland (College Football Hall of Fame) (AFCA, AAB, NEA, SN, UP, WC)
Hal Miller, Georgia Tech (AP-3, FWAA, NEA, SN, UP, WC)
Doug Atkins, Tennessee (AAB; INS)
Ed Meadows, Duke (AFCA; AP-2)
Kline Gilbert, Mississippi (AP-1, FWAA)
Dave Suminski, Wisconsin (AP-1)
Harvey Achziger, Colorado A&M (INS)
Bob Fleck, Syracuse (INS)
J.D. Kimmel, Houston (AP-1)
Charlie LaPradd, Florida (AP-1)
Jerry Minnick, Nebraska (INS)
Oliver Spencer, Kansas (NEA)
Ben Dunkerley, West Virginia (AP-2)
Eldred Kraemer, Pittsburgh (AP-2)
William "Bill" Skyinskus, Syracuse (AP-2)

Guards 
John Michels, Tennessee (College Football Hall of Fame) (AAB, AP-1, FWAA, NEA, SN, UP, WC)
Elmer Willhoite, Southern California (AFCA, AP-2, FWAA, INS, NEA, UP, WC)
Steve Eisenhauer, Navy (AP-1, INS, NEA, SN)
Harley Sewell, Texas (AFCA, AAB, AP-2, NEA)
Marv Matuszak, Tulsa (AP-1)
Frank Kush, Michigan State (AP-1)
Michael "Mike" Takacs, Ohio State (INS)
James "Jim" Reichenbach, Ohio State (AP-2)
Chester Millett, Holy Cross (AP-2)

Centers 
Donn Moomaw, UCLA (College Football Hall of Fame) (AFCA, AP-1, NEA, SN, UP, WC)
Tom Catlin, Oklahoma (AAB, FWAA, INS, NEA, SN)
Dick Tamburo, Michigan State (AP-1, CP-1, INS)
Pete Brown, Georgia Tech (AP-1)
Joe Schmidt, Pittsburgh (INS)
James Dooley, Penn State (AP-2)
Tom Catlin, Oklahoma (AP-2)
George Morris, Georgia Tech (AP-2)

Backs 
Jack Scarbath, Maryland (College Football Hall of Fame) (AAB, AFCA, AP-1, COL-1, FWAA, INS, NEA, SN, UP, Look-1)
Johnny Lattner, Notre Dame (College Football Hall of Fame) (AAB; AFCA; AP-1, FWAA, INS, NEA, SN, UP, WC)
Billy Vessels, Oklahoma (Heisman Trophy winner and College Football Hall of Fame) (AAB; AP-1, FWAA, INS, NEA, SN, UP, WC)
Jim Sears, Southern California (AP-1, INS, NEA; WC)
Don McAuliffe, Michigan State (AAB; COL-1, UP)
Leon Hardeman, Georgia Tech (AAB, INS, SN)
Johnny Olszewski, California (INS, NEA; AP-2)
Bobby Morehead, Georgia Tech (AP-1, INS)
Paul Giel, Minnesota (AP-1, FWAA)
Buck McPhail, Oklahoma (AFCA)
Lowell Perry, Michigan (NEA)
Paul Cameron, UCLA (NEA)
Don Heinrich, Washington (AP-1)
Gene Filipski, Villanova (FWAA)
Andy Kozar, Tennessee (AP-2)
Bobby Marlow, Alabama (AP-2)
Ed Mioduszewski, William & Mary (AP-2)
Val Joe Walker, Southern Methodist (AP-2)
Norris Mullis, South Carolina (AP-2)
Gilbert "Gil" Reich, Kansas (AP-2)

Key

Official selectors

Other selectors

See also
 1952 All-Big Seven Conference football team
 1952 All-Big Ten Conference football team
 1952 All-Pacific Coast Conference football team
 1952 All-SEC football team
 1952 All-Southwest Conference football team

References

All-America Team
College Football All-America Teams